James Barney Quilter (April 9, 1919 – August 15, 2005) was a member of the Ohio House of Representatives.

Early life 
Quilter was born in 1919 to James and Helen Marie Quilter and he grew up in East Toledo. He served in the 167th Combat Engineer Battalion in Europe during World War II. Quilter married Mary Carmella Sarno in 1944. Together they had two children.

Career 
In 1957 and 1965, Quilter ran unsuccessfully for the Toledo City Council. He worked in public relations at the Toledo Health and Retirees Center.

Quilter served in the Ohio House of Representatives for 20 years.

He died at the age of 86 in August 2005.

References

Democratic Party members of the Ohio House of Representatives
1919 births
2005 deaths
20th-century American politicians
Politicians from Toledo, Ohio
People from Oregon, Ohio